The 2011–12 season will be Al-Minaa's 36th season in the Iraqi Premier League, having featured in all 38 editions of the competition except two.

Squad

Out on loan

Transfers

In

Out
{| class="wikitable"
|-
! Date
! Pos.
! Name
! To
! Fee
|-
| September 2011
| FW
|   Hussam Ibrahim
|   Al-Shorta
| –
|-

Technical staff
{| class="wikitable"
|-
! Position
! Name
|-
| Coach
|  Rahim Hameed
|-
| Fitness coach
|  Ali Lafta
|-
| Goalkeeping coach
|  Saddam Salman
|-
| Club doctor
|  Faris Abdullah
|-

Board members

Stadium
During the previous season, the stadium of Al-Mina'a demolished. A company will build a new stadium that will be completed in 2015. Since they can't play their games at Al Mina'a Stadium, they will be playing at Az-Zubair Olympic Stadium during this season.

Matches

Iraqi Premier League
 Away matches

 Home matches

Summary table

Top scorers

Sources
 Iraqi League 2011/2012
 Al-Minaa SC: Transfers and News
 Iraqia Sport TV

Al-Mina'a SC seasons
Al Mina